Ensete is a genus of monocarpic flowering plants native to tropical regions of Africa and Asia. It is one of the three genera in the banana family, Musaceae, and includes the false banana or enset (E. ventricosum), an economically important food crop in Ethiopia.

Taxonomy 
The genus Ensete was first described by Paul Fedorowitsch Horaninow (or Horaninov, 1796–1865) in his Prodromus Monographiae Scitaminarum of 1862 in which he created a single species, Ensete edule. However, the genus did not receive general recognition until 1947 when it was revived by E. E. Cheesman in the first of a series of papers in the Kew Bulletin on the classification of the bananas, with a total of 25 species.

Taxonomically, the genus Ensete has shrunk since Cheesman revived the taxon. Cheesman acknowledged that field study might reveal synonymy and the most recent review of the genus by Simmonds (1960) listed just six. Recently the number has increased to seven as the Flora of China has, not entirely convincingly, reinstated Ensete wilsonii. There is one species in Thailand, somewhat resembling E. superbum, that has not been formally described, and possibly other Asian species.

It is possible to separate Ensete into its African and Asian species.

Africa
Ensete gilletii synonym Ensete livingstonianum - native range W. Tropical Africa to Malawi
Ensete homblei -  native range is SE. DR Congo to N. Zambia
Ensete perrieri – endemic to Madagascar but intriguingly like the Asian E. glaucum
Ensete ventricosum – enset or false banana, widely cultivated as a food plant in Ethiopia

Asia
Ensete glaucum – widespread in Asia from India to Papua New Guinea
Ensete superbum – Western Ghats of India
Ensete wilsonii – Yunnan, China, but doubtfully distinct from E. glaucum
Ensete sp. "Thailand" – possibly a new species or a disjunct population of E. superbum

Extinct species 
Ensete oregonense Clarno Formation, Oregon, United States, Eocene

See also 
 List of Ethiopian dishes and foods
List of Southern African indigenous trees
Musa (genus)
Musella lasiocarpa
Plantain

Notes

Relevant literature 
 Borrell, James S., Mark Goodwin, Guy Blomme, Kim Jacobsen, Abebe M. Wendawek, Dawd Gashu, Ermias Lulekal, Zemede Asfaw, Sebsebe Demissew, and Paul Wilkin. "Enset‐based agricultural systems in Ethiopia: A systematic review of production trends, agronomy, processing and the wider food security applications of a neglected banana relative." Plants, People, Planet 2, no. 3 (2020): 212-228.

External links

 (1999): 
IPNI Listing
Enset as a crop (UNEUE)
Enset Culture (UNEUE)
American Association for the Advancement of Science – The Tree Against Hunger: Enset-based Agricultural Systems in Ethiopia.
Oxfam – Holes in the Safety Net
"A study on Esset as a means of existence, social organization and ethnical identification for the Gurage people", Master's thesis, University of Tromsø (2009)
Kew Plant List

 
Crops originating from Ethiopia
Indomalayan realm flora
Musaceae
Root vegetables
Staple foods
Tropical fruit
Tropical agriculture
Zingiberales genera

no:Bananfamilien